The 2014 OFC President's Cup was the first edition of the OFC President's Cup, a competition organised by the Oceania Football Confederation (OFC) between invitational club and/or national sides. A decision to create this competition was confirmed at the OFC's Executive committee in March 2014. The inaugural competition took place in Auckland, New Zealand between the dates of 17–23 November 2014, with Auckland City defeating Amicale in the final to win the 2014 President's Cup.

Format
A total of six teams participated in the tournament: the reigning OFC Champions League winners and runners-up, two teams from the Asian Football Confederation and one team from Concacaf.

The competition was played in two groups of three teams with the top team in each group advancing to the final, and the remaining teams advancing to the third and fifth place matches.

Teams
The OFC formally announced the participating teams on 19 September 2014.

Venue
The tournament was staged at the Trusts Arena in Auckland, New Zealand.

Group stage
The draw for the group stage was held on 8 October 2014 at the OFC Headquarters in Auckland, New Zealand. The six teams were drawn into two groups of three, with Auckland City and Busaiteen seeded. In each group, the three teams played each other on a round-robin basis. The group winners advanced to the final, the runners-up advanced to the third place match, and the third-placed teams advanced to the fifth place match.

All times UTC+13.

Group A

Group B

Final stage

Fifth place match

Third place match

Final

Final ranking

Awards

Top goalscorers

References

External links
OFC President's Cup 2014, oceaniafootball.com

2014
President's Cup
2014–15 in New Zealand association football
2014 Ofc President's Cup